Orion 1 or Orion-1 may refer to:

 Exploration Flight Test-1, the first test launch of the Orion space capsule in 2014
 Orión (rocket), a sounding rocket prototype from Argentina, launched in 1965 and 1966
 Orion (space telescope), a space telescope flown in 1971 aboard the Salyut 1 space station
 Orion 1, a communications satellite launched in 1994, later renamed Telstar 11
 Mission Orion 1, a cancelled Constellation program

See also
 1 Orionis, a star in the constellation of Orion